() is an organization that was founded in 1936 by 7 renowned chefs from the Lyon area, including the founder and first president of the organization, . It also aims to promote Lyonnais gastronomy and regional products.

There are currently about 120 chefs who work to promote Lyon's gastronomy at local, national and international levels.

List of presidents 
Marius Vettard (1936–1976)
Paul Blanc (1976–1982)
Roger Roucoud (1983–1987)
Pierre Orsi (1988–1993)
Guy Lassaussaie (1994–2006)
Christophe Marguin (2006–2012)
Laurent Bouvier (2012–2015)
 (Since 2015)

References

External links 
 

Organizations established in 1936
Cultural organizations based in France
Cuisine of Lyon